Sultan Abdul Jamil Shah I ibni Almarhum Sultan Muhammad Shah (died 1512) was the third Sultan of Pahang who reigned from 1495 to 1512. He was installed by Sultan Mahmud of Melaka in 1495 following the abdication of his uncle, Ahmad Shah I. Earlier, his cousin and son of Ahmad Shah, Mansur Shah succeeded his father at young age. Abdul Jamil took the responsibility as a regent and exercised greater authority in the government. He reigned jointly with Mansur Shah until his death in 1512.

Personal life
Sultan Abdul Jamil was known as Raja Abdul Jamil before his accession. He was the eldest of the three sons of the first Sultan of Pahang, Muhammad Shah by his wife, Mengindra Putri, a Kelantanese princess, the granddaughter of Sultan Iskandar Shah of Kelantan (r. 1429–1467). His other siblings include Raja Ahmad and Raja Mahmud, the future Sultan Mahmud Shah.

According to the Malay Annals, Sultan Abdul Jamil was married to his first cousin, Raja Fatimah, the daughter of Sultan Alauddin, and full elder sister to Mahmud Shah of Melaka. The Bustanus Salatin on the other hand, provides a different account, suggesting Raja Fatimah had married her other cousin instead, another Sultan of Pahang, Sultan Mansur. Historians seems to agree with the account in the Malay Annals, based on the discovery of the tomb of Raja Fatimah next to the tomb of Sultan Abdul Jamil in the Ziarat Raja Raden graveyard, Pekan.

Reign
Following the abdication of his uncle, Ahmad Shah I who went into religious seclusion, and the succession of his cousin Raja Mansur as the new Sultan in 1495, Raja Jamil took responsibility for guardianship of the young Sultan. Since Pahang at that time was effectively a vassal of Melaka, Sultan Mahmud of Melaka had sent his minister Seri Dewa Raja to install his preferred new ruler, and Raja Jamil was ultimately crowned Sultan. As there were no indications that Mansur Shah was deposed, it is believed that both rulers reigned jointly from 1495.

The reign of the two Sultans oversaw the restoration of ties between Pahang and Melaka, that previously marred with diplomatic tensions during the reign of Ahmad Shah I. In 1500, the ruler of Nakhon Si Thammarat Kingdom, known in Malay tradition as Ligor, on the instructions of his overlord Ramathibodi II of Ayutthaya, launched an invasion through land route reaching Tembeling from Kelantan. Both Pahang and Melaka cooperated in facing the common danger. An army led by Bendahara Seri Maharaja was sent by Melaka to support the defence of Pahang. The forts at Pekan were strengthened, with the main fortification called 'Fort of Pahang' or 'Fort of Biram' was constructed right before the invasion. The combined Pahang and Melaka forces have ultimately managed to repel the invasion with the opposing side suffering heavy casualties and were forced to flee. It was the last Thai's attempt to subjugate the southern Malay states.

In 1511, the capital of Melaka fell to the Portuguese Empire. The exiled Sultan Mahmud retreated to Pagoh, Muar before he was again defeated by the Portuguese forces and retreated further through the Penarikan route to Pahang, where he was cordially received by Sultan Abdul Jamil.

Death
Between 1511 and 1512, while Sultan Mahmud was still in Pahang, Sultan Abdul Jamil died and was buried in the grave-yard of Ziarat Raja Raden, Pekan. He was posthumously known as Marhum Ziarat ('the late ruler who was buried at Ziarat'). According the 'Commentaries' written by Brás de Albuquerque, it was claimed that Sultan Mahmud was the one who died of grief in Pahang after his expulsion from Melaka. This however contradicts with the official records that states Sultan Mahmud only died later in 1528 and buried at Kampar, Sumatra where his grave is currently located. It can be inferred that the Portuguese must have mistaken Abdul Jamil for Sultan Mahmud.

The graveyard Ziarat Raja Raden is located in Pekan on the west bank of the stream Pekan river near the spot where it joins the Pahang river. It contains several graves belonging to Pahang royal family from 15 to 16th centuries. The tombstone at the grave of Raja Fatimah was inscribed with her name and the date of her death, 15 Shawwal 900 AH (corresponds to 7 July 1495). The epitaph on Sultan Abdul Jamil's tomb, which is situated by the side of that of Raja Fatimah, reads :

Until 1970s, Abdul Jamil's grave was erroneously thought by locals to be that of the Sultan Abdul Jalil of Johor (Marhum Kuala Pahang) who was killed at Kuala Pahang in 1720. This is however, is very unlikely as the year shown on the tombstone was 917 AH (corresponds to 1511–1512).

Ancestry

References

Bibliography
 
 
 
 
 
 

1512 deaths
Sultans of Pahang
15th-century monarchs in Asia
16th-century monarchs in Asia